is a passenger railway station located in the city of Miyoshi, Tokushima Prefecture, Japan. It is operated by JR Shikoku and has the station number "B23".

Lines
Only local trains stop at the station.

Layout
The station consists of an island platform serving two tracks. A siding branches track 1. The station building is unstaffed and serves only as a waiting room. Access to the island platform is by means of a footbridge.

Adjacent stations

History
With the privatization of Japanese National Railways (JNR), the successor to JGR, on 1 April 1987, Tsuji came under the control of JR Shikoku. On 1 June 1988, the line was renamed the Tokushima Line.

Passenger statistics
In fiscal 2019, the station was used by an average of 185 passengers daily

Surrounding area
Tokushima Prefectural Ikeda High School Tsuji School
Yoshino River
 Japan National Route 192
Miyoshi City Hall Igawa Branch office
 Miyoshi City Ikawa Junior High School

See also
List of railway stations in Japan

References

External links

 JR Shikoku timetable

Railway stations in Tokushima Prefecture
Railway stations in Japan opened in 1914
Miyoshi, Tokushima